Rayan Khemais (born 7 April 1998), is a French footballer of Tunisian descent, who currently plays as a defender for Stade Tunisien.

Career statistics

Club

Notes

References

1998 births
Living people
Footballers from Nîmes
French footballers
French sportspeople of Tunisian descent
Tunisian footballers
Association football defenders
Championnat National 3 players
Championnat National 2 players
Tunisian Ligue Professionnelle 1 players
Nîmes Olympique players
Stade Tunisien players